Ypsilanti Community Schools (YCS) is a K-12 school district headquartered in Ypsilanti Township, Michigan.

It was formed on July 1, 2013, by the merger of the Ypsilanti Public School District and the Willow Run School District. Experts in K-12 education along with university, business, and parent partners assisted in the development of the district. The district offers a K-12 International Baccalaureate curriculum, a STEMM Middle College, and a variety of teaching methods.

YCS serves students who reside in the City of Ypsilanti and portions of Ypsilanti Township and Superior Township.

Schools
High School programs:
 Ypsilanti Community High School - Includes AC Tech High School and STEMM Middle College 
 A.C.C.E. at George School (Achieving Career and College Education) 
 Career and Technical Education - Includes programs in Collision Repair; Culinary Arts and Hospitality; Construction Technology (through WCC); Certified Nurse Assistant (through WCC); and Aviation Technology (through MIAT)

Washtenaw Educational Options Consortium programs: 

YCS participates in the Washtenaw Educational Options Consortium (WEOC), which operates several programs. 
 Early College Alliance (ECA)
 Washtenaw International Middle Academy (WIMA), co-located with Washtenaw International High School
 Washtenaw International High School (WIHI)
 Washtenaw Alliance for Virtual Education (WAVE)

Middle School programs:
 YCS Middle School - Comprehensive middle school curriculum 

Elementary schools:
 Ypsilanti International Elementary School (Young 5s/K-5) - International Baccalaureate Primary Years Programme (IB PYP)
 Erickson Elementary (1-5) - A Leader in Me School
 Holmes Elementary School (2-5) 
 Estabrook Elementary School (2-5)

PreK-1 Early Learning Centers:
 Beatty Early Learning Center
 Ford Early Learning Center 
 Perry Early Learning Center

References

External links
 Ypsilanti Community Schools
Ypsilanti, Michigan
School districts in Michigan
Education in Washtenaw County, Michigan
2013 establishments in Michigan
School districts established in 2013